Lock 32 State Canal Park is a New York state park in Monroe County, New York.

References 

State parks of New York (state)